Atlanta Township may refer to the following townships in the United States:

 Atlanta Township, Logan County, Illinois
 Atlanta Township, Rice County, Kansas
 Atlanta Township, Becker County, Minnesota